This is a list of some of the approximately 40,000 caves in Turkey, which provide an important tourist attraction for the country. There are such a high number due to karstification in the west and central Taurus Mountains. The Cavern Research Society (MAD) established in 1964 initially monitored and investigates these caves, a role which has been taken up by BÜMAK (Boğaziçi University Speleological Society) and Karst and Cavern Exploration Unit (under the MTA Geology Studies Department). 800 caves and caverns have been investigated thus far.

List

The following is an incomplete list of caves in Turkey. Show caves are shown in bold. Show caves shoen in italic can be toured by appropriate equipped visitors and under guidance. Not specially indicated caves are reserved for professional cavers only.

See also
 Derinkuyu Underground City
List of caves
 Speleology

References

External links
Website featuring articles on caves

 
Turkey
Caves